|}

The Dipper Novices' Chase is a Grade 2 National Hunt chase in Great Britain which is open to horses aged five years or older. It is run on the New Course at Cheltenham over a distance of about 2 miles and 4½ furlongs (2 miles 4 furlongs and 127 yards or 4,175 metres), and during its running there are seventeen fences to be jumped. The race is for novice chasers, and it is scheduled to take place each year on New Year's Day.

Before 2005 the event was usually run at Newcastle in mid January. Its distance at this venue was 2 miles and 4 furlongs (4,023 metres), and there were sixteen fences to jump. Prior to the 1990–91 season it took place in November.

The race was first run in 1980.

Winners

See also
 Horse racing in Great Britain
 List of British National Hunt races

References
 Racing Post:

 pedigreequery.com – Dipper Novices' Chase – Cheltenham.
 bbc.co.uk – Haydock racing abandoned (4 January 2003).
 telegraph.co.uk – Weather forecast unfavourable (2 January 2004).

National Hunt races in Great Britain
Cheltenham Racecourse
National Hunt chases
Recurring sporting events established in 1980
1980 establishments in England